San Giovanni di Gerace (Greek-Calabrian dialect: Ièrax) is a comune (municipality) in the Province of Reggio Calabria in the Italian region Calabria, located about  southwest of Catanzaro and about  northeast of Reggio Calabria.

San Giovanni di Gerace borders the following municipalities: Grotteria, Martone.

Demographic evolution

References

Cities and towns in Calabria